Imposters is an American dark comedy television series. The show premiered February 7, 2017, on the Bravo cable network with a 10-episode season. Announced in April 2015 as My So Called Wife, the series follows con artist Maddie, played by Inbar Lavi, who gets involved in relationships with men and women before leaving them "used and robbed of everything  including their hearts". On April 17, 2017, Bravo renewed the series for a second season, which premiered on April 5, 2018. On June 1, 2018, Bravo canceled the series after two seasons.

Premise
Maddie Jonson (Inbar Lavi) is a con artist who works with Max (Brian Benben) and Sally (Katherine LaNasa) at the behest of a mysterious figure called "The Doctor" (Ray Proscia) who has teams of con artists working for him in multiple cities. Their method of operation is to make their targets (male or female) fall in love with Maddie while insinuating themselves into their lives, and then steal all their valuables shortly after marrying them. After Ezra Bloom (Rob Heaps) becomes the latest victim of their con, he is visited by Richard Evans (Parker Young), one of Maddie's previous targets, who is looking for her. Together they find Jules Langmore (Marianne Rendón), an artist, who also was married to Maddie. The three decide to team up and look for Maddie.

Season 1 
Season 1 revolves around the three jilted spouses Ezra, Richard and Jules venturing out together to look for their con artist wife. They brainstorm their way into finding clues about her roots and end up discovering her hometown and her parents' home. In the meanwhile Maddie has found a new target in Seattle and is working on him while an unexpected love interest sparks between her and independently rich Patrick she meets at a coffee shop. Maddie's partners in crime, Max does not approve of her love interest and prompts Maddie to concentrate on her work. Ezra, Richard and Jules finally find Maddie and discover that they all still have feelings for her so can never let any real harm come her way. They warn her about the reality of Patrick which shakes Maddie and she plans a counter action. Season 1 ends in a wedding, a chase and a stolen ring that FBI is looking for.

Filming Locations
The first season was filmed in Vancouver, British Columbia, Canada. Season 2 was filmed in Toronto, Niagara Falls and Mexico.

Cast

Main
 Inbar Lavi as Maddie Jonson/Ava/Alice/CeCe/Saffron/Molly, a career con-artist working for the mysterious and dangerous Doctor who wants out after cons begin to take a toll on her.
 Rob Heaps as Ezra Bloom, Maddie's latest conned husband who launches a plot to track her down and get his money back.
 Parker Young as Richard Evans, Maddie's former husband and fellow conned ex. He tracks down Ezra while looking for Maddie and they launch an investigation together.
 Marianne Rendón as Julia "Jules" Langmore, Maddie's former wife who comes from a rich family, whom she conned money out of. She joins Ezra and Richard's investigation into Maddie’s crimes.
 Stephen Bishop as Patrick Campbell, an undercover FBI agent who becomes entangled with Maddie.
 Brian Benben as Max, Maddie's co-worker who is in charge of the technicalities of conning lovers.
 Ray Proscia as Jeffrey Hull/The Doctor, the mysterious dangerous man in charge of the game.
 Katherine LaNasa as Sally, initially worked with Maddie and Max while wanting to run away, but later became a lethal enforcer for the Doctor. (season 2; recurring in season 1)

Recurring

 Uma Thurman as Lenny Cohen, The Doctor's assassin who "takes care" of people who are "not doing their jobs".
 Denise Dowse as Auntie Colleen / Agent Cook, Patrick's FBI agent boss who poses as his aunt.
 Adam Korson as Josh Bloom, Ezra's dimwitted brother.
 Mary Kay Place as Marsha Bloom, Ezra's innocent and good-natured mother.
 Mark Harelik as Arthur Bloom, Ezra's dishonest father.
 Aaron Douglas as Gary Heller, Maddie's short tempered con who is well aware of the mysterious Doctor. (season 1)
 Paul Adelstein as Shelly Cohen, Lenny's husband who is also one of the Doctor's assassins. (season 2)
 Laura Archbold as Sophia/Rosa, Ezra's new love interest who is a fellow con-artist that he meets in Mexico. (season 2)
 Rachel Skarsten as Poppy Langmore, Jules' uptight, rich sister who takes a liking to Richard when he learns Maddie modeled Alice after her. (season 2)
 Anne-Marie Johnson as Gail, Maddie's therapist at a luxury retreat center

Guest

 Megan Park as Gaby.
 Jaime Ray Newman as Linda, a woman who Maddie meets at a self-help center. (season 2)
 Griffin Dunne as Herman, a man who helps the imposters hide in Mexico City. (season 2)
 Mauricio de Montellano as Federale, a mexican cop who helps the FBI find the imposters while they hide from the police in Mexico. (season 2)
 Mikey Madison as young Maddie (2 episodes)

Episodes

Series overview
<onlyinclude>

Season 1 (2017)

Season 2 (2018)

Reception

Critical response
The show has received largely positive reviews. On the site Metacritic, it received a score of 70, indicating "generally favorable reviews". On Rotten Tomatoes, the show is rated 92% fresh, with the site's consensus reading, "Imposters meshes slapstick comedy, top-notch writing, unexpected twists, and a noteworthy lead performance, with satisfying -- and surprisingly ambitious -- results".

Ratings

Season 1

Season 2

Accolades
The series was nominated for Drama Series, and Inbar Lavi won Actress Drama Series, at the 2017 Women's Image Network Awards.

References

External links
 
 

2010s American comedy-drama television series
2017 American television series debuts
2018 American television series endings
2010s American black comedy television series
2010s American LGBT-related comedy television series
Bisexuality-related television series
English-language television shows
Lesbian-related television shows
Serial drama television series
Bravo (American TV network) original programming
Television series by Universal Content Productions